The 2021–22 Top10 was the 92nd edition of the Italian rugby union championship. Petrarca Rugby won their 14th title, after beating defending champions Rugby Rovigo Delta 19–6.

Teams

Competition format
The top four teams at the end of the regular season (after all the teams played one another twice, once at home, once away) enter a knockout stage to decide the Champions of Italy. This consists of two rounds: semi-finals and final. 

A new bonus points system was introduced in this season:
 4 points for a win.
 2 points for a draw.
 1 bonus point for winning while scoring at least 3 more tries than the opponent.
 1 bonus point for losing by 5 points (or fewer).

Table

Results

Championship play-offs

References

2021–22 in Italian rugby union